The 48th Kerala State Film Awards, presented by the Kerala State Chalachitra Academy were announced by the Minister for Cultural Affairs, A. K. Balan in Thiruvananthapuram on 8 March 2018.

Writing category

Jury

Awards
All award recipients receive a cash prize, certificate and statuette.

Special Jury Mention
All recipients receive a certificate and statuette.

Film category

Jury

Awards
All award recipients receive a cash prize, certificate and statuette.

Special Jury Mention
All recipients receive a certificate and statuette.

References

External links 
 http://www.keralafilm.com

Kerala State Film Awards
2017 Indian film awards